Polygala africana is a species of flowering plant in the milkwort family (Polygalaceae). It was first described in 1893.

Distribution 
It is endemic to Angola, DRC, Eswatini, Malawi, Mozambique, Namibia, Northern Provinces, Tanzania, Zambia, and Zimbabwe.

Description 
Polygala africana grows to a height of 8–15 centimeters with stems branching. Its flowers are pink.

References 

africana
Flora of Angola
Flora of Malawi
Flora of Namibia
Flora of Tanzania
Flora of the Democratic Republic of the Congo
Flora of Mozambique
Flora of Swaziland
Flora of Zambia
Flora of Zimbabwe